The Kingdom of Bohemia, an autonomous part of Austria-Hungary until 1918, competed at some of the early modern Olympic Games.  The team made its debut at the 1900 Summer Olympics.  After World War I, Bohemia became part of the new Czechoslovakia, and Bohemian athletes competed for Czechoslovakia at the Olympics.  After the 1992 Summer Olympics and the dissolution of Czechoslovakia into the Czech Republic and Slovakia in 1993, Bohemian athletes competed for the Czech Republic at the Olympics.  If these post-war appearances are counted, Bohemia has missed only three Olympics: the inaugural 1896 Summer Olympics, the 1904 Summer Olympics (the first held outside Europe) and as Czechoslovakia, the 1984 Summer Olympics which were boycotted by the USSR and its satellites.

Participation

Timeline of participation

Medal tables

Medals by Summer Games

Medals by summer sport

List of medalists 

Hedwiga Rosenbaumová also won a bronze medal with Archibald Warden of Great Britain (GBR) in the mixed doubles event in tennis at the 1900 Summer Olympics.  This medal is attributed to a mixed team instead of split between Bohemia and Great Britain.

Summary by sport

Athletics

Bohemia first competed in track and field athletics in the nation's debut in 1900, sending 4 athletes who competed in five events. They won a silver medal, the best result of any event at any Games for Bohemia, which never won a gold medal and no other silver medals.

Cycling

Bohemia's debut in 1900 included one cyclist. Bohemia did not win any medals in cycling.

Gymnastics

Bohemia's Olympic debut in 1900 included one gymnast, František Erben, who placed 32nd of 135 in the men's all-around.

Tennis

Bohemia's Olympic debut in 1900 included one tennis player, Hedwiga Rosenbaumová, who took one of the bronze medals in the women's singles. It was Bohemia's only tennis medal, though the nation competed in tennis in each of its three appearances.

See also
 List of flag bearers for Bohemia at the Olympics
 :Category:Olympic competitors for Bohemia

References

External links